Abigail Anne Spanberger (née Davis, August 7, 1979) is an American politician serving as the U.S. representative from  since 2019. She is a member of the Democratic Party. Spanberger is a former Central Intelligence Agency (CIA) officer.

Spanberger defeated Republican incumbent Dave Brat in 2018, ending the Republican Party's 36-year hold on the district. She won reelection in 2020 and 2022.

Early life and education
Abigail Spanberger was born in Red Bank, New Jersey, on August 7, 1979. When she was 13, her family relocated to the Short Pump area in Henrico County in Virginia, outside Richmond. She attended John Randolph Tucker High School. Spanberger was later a page for U.S. Senator Chuck Robb.

Spanberger earned a Bachelor of Arts degree from the University of Virginia and a Master of Business Administration from a joint program between the GISMA Business School in Germany and Purdue University's Krannert School of Management.

Early career 
In 2002 and 2003, Spanberger taught English literature as a substitute teacher at the Islamic Saudi Academy in Northern Virginia. In the early 2000s, she was a postal inspector, working on money laundering and narcotics cases.

In 2006, Spanberger joined the Central Intelligence Agency as an operations officer. She said she gathered intelligence about nuclear proliferation and terrorism.

In 2014, Spanberger left the CIA and entered the private sector. She was hired by Royall & Company (now EAB). In 2017, Virginia Governor Terry McAuliffe appointed her to the Virginia Fair Housing Board.

U.S. House of Representatives

Elections

2018 

She made the final decision to run after the House of Representatives voted to repeal the Affordable Care Act. On June 12, 2018, Spanberger defeated Dan Ward in the Democratic primary election with 73% of the vote, receiving more votes than any other candidate in the Virginia primaries that day. Her campaign outraised Brat's.

In August, the Congressional Leadership Fund, a super PAC closely aligned with Republican Speaker of the House Paul Ryan, conducted a smear campaign against Spanberger. The smear campaign, which attempted to tie her to terrorism, was based on an SF-86 application she completed to obtain security clearance, which was inappropriately released in breach of privacy rules. She won the November 6 general election by just over 6,600 votes. While Brat won eight of the district's ten counties, Spanberger dominated the two largest counties, Henrico and Chesterfield, by a combined margin of over 30,000 votes.

In a visit to the district, former Trump adviser Steve Bannon described it as "an absolute bellwether of the entire country", adding that losing the district would mean the GOP losing control of the House.

A number of sources claimed Spanberger was the first Democrat to win this seat since 1970, when four-term Democrat John Marsh retired and was succeeded by Republican J. Kenneth Robinson. But until 1993, the 7th stretched from the outer Washington suburbs through the Shenandoah Valley and Charlottesville to the outer Richmond suburbs; the present 7th is geographically and demographically the successor to what was the 3rd district before 1993.

2020 

Spanberger faced a close reelection contest against State Delegate Nick Freitas, who represents much of the congressional district's northern portion. She won with 51% of the vote to Freitas's 49%. Freitas carried eight of the district's ten counties, as Brat had done two years earlier. But Spanberger again prevailed by winning the district's shares of Henrico and Chesterfield counties by a combined 43,400 votes, five times her overall margin of 8,400 votes. She was also boosted by Joe Biden narrowly carrying the district; Biden is the first Democrat to win what is now the 7th since 1948.

On November 5, days after winning reelection by a margin of 1.8%, Spanberger criticized the Democratic Party's strategy for the 2020 elections in a phone call with other Democratic caucus members that was subsequently leaked. Calling the elections "a failure" from a congressional standpoint, she singled out Republican attack ads decrying "socialism" and the movement to "defund the police" as prime reasons the Democratic Party lost seats in swing districts. She argued that Democrats should watch Republican ads before deciding how to talk about issues and "not ever use the word 'socialist' or 'socialism' ever again".

CNN political editor Chris Cillizza described Spanberger's remarks as "some hard truth" for the Democratic Party, adding that in order to succeed in the 2022 and 2024 elections, the party should "listen to the likes of Spanberger" instead of pushing for "the boldest possible progressive legislation". Spanberger's remarks were disputed by Speaker Nancy Pelosi, who noted that Democrats kept the House, and progressive Representative Rashida Tlaib, who said the Democratic Party should "study the results" before dismissing progressives who represent their districts. The Washington Post digital editor James Downie criticized Spanberger's view, remarking that if a losing officeholder "couldn't manage to tie his or her Republican opponent to almost a quarter of a million COVID-19 deaths in the United States, a tanked economy or a dozen other policy fiascos, that's the candidate's fault." Downie quoted progressive Representative Alexandria Ocasio-Cortez, who had noted that no swing-district House Democrat who co-sponsored Medicare for All lost their seat, and had remarked in response to Spanberger's comments that "not a single member of Congress that I'm aware of campaigned on socialism or defunding the police in this general election."

2022 

After the 2020 United States redistricting cycle, Spanberger's district was radically redrawn, and no longer included her home in Henrico County. Despite this, Spanberger ran for reelection in the seat. She was seen as one of the most vulnerable incumbents of the 2022 election cycle, with pre-election polls projecting a close race with Republican nominee Yesli Vega, a law enforcement officer endorsed by Governor Glenn Youngkin and former President Donald Trump. In the general election, Spanberger defeated Vega with 52.3% of the vote.

Committee assignments 
Spanberger's committee assignments include:

 Committee on Agriculture
 Subcommittee on Commodity Exchanges, Energy, and Credit
 Subcommittee on Conservation and Forestry (Chair)
 Committee on Foreign Affairs
 Subcommittee on Asia, the Pacific and Nonproliferation
 Subcommittee on Europe, Eurasia, Energy, and the Environment

Caucus memberships 
 LGBT Equality Caucus
 New Democrat Coalition
Problem Solvers Caucus
Congressional Armenian Caucus

Political positions
Some commentators have characterized Spanberger as a centrist Democrat. In the 2019 Speaker of the United States House of Representatives election on the opening day of the 116th United States Congress, Spanberger voted for U.S. Representative Cheri Bustos, an Illinois Democrat, joining 11 other Democrats who did not back Nancy Pelosi.

Abortion
Spanberger supports legal abortion.

COVID-19 policy
On February 1, 2023, Spanberger was among 12 Democrats to vote for a resolution to end the COVID-19 national emergency.

On January 31, 2023, Spanberger was among seven Democrats to vote for H.R.497:Freedom for Health Care Workers Act, a bill that would lift COVID-19 vaccine mandates for healthcare workers.

Economy
Although not a member of Congress when it passed, Spanberger criticized the 2017 Tax Cuts and Jobs Act supported by President Donald Trump, arguing that its permanent tax cuts for corporations would increase the national debt.

Spanberger has called for the passage of the USMCA trade deal negotiated between the Trump administration, Mexico, and Canada.

In May 2020, Spanberger voted against the HEROES Act, a proposed $3 trillion stimulus package in response to the COVID-19 pandemic. She said the bill went "far beyond" pandemic relief and had no chance of passing the Republican-controlled Senate. In November 2020, Spanberger led a bipartisan effort to secure the 340B Drug Pricing Program against changes that would lead to significant increases in prescription medication costs.

Spanberger supports banning members of Congress from trading stocks. She has introduced legislation that would require lawmakers, as well as their spouses and dependent children, to place assets in a blind trust while in office.

Environment
Spanberger has called climate change "one of the greatest and most imminent threats to our economy, our national security, and our way of life" and promised to "stand up to attacks against science." During a Committee on Foreign Affairs meeting in 2019, Spanberger asked the Trump administration to reverse its isolationist policies, saying, "it’s in [the US's] national interest to reinforce our stature as a global leader on international environmental and energy issues."

She described the Green New Deal proposed by Alexandria Ocasio-Cortez as a "bold compilation of ideas meant to address global climate change" but criticized it for allegedly including unrelated policy proposals and not identifying specific resolutions to the problems that it identifies. "Overall I am not a supporter of the Green New Deal", she said.

Foreign affairs
In February 2023, during the Russo-Ukrainian War, Spanberger signed a letter advocating for President Biden to give F-16 fighter jets to Ukraine.

Guns
Spanberger has called for a new version of the Federal Assault Weapons Ban that expired in 2004. She favors requiring background checks on private gun sales and supported a ban on bump stocks.

Health care
Spanberger supports the Affordable Care Act (Obamacare). She supports a public option for healthcare via the proposed Medicare-X Choice Act. In November 2020, she described reducing the cost of prescription drugs as "the top priority of families in [her] district".

In January 2020, Spanberger sponsored the Public Disclosure of Drug Discounts Act, which passed the House unanimously. The bill requires pharmacy benefit managers (PBMs), who manage prescription drug benefits for health insurance companies, to publicize the rebates, discounts, and price concessions they negotiate, via a website hosted by the U.S. Secretary of Health and Human Services. Spanberger also co-sponsored the Elijah Cummings Lower Drug Costs Now Act, which grants Medicare Part D the power to negotiate prescription prices directly with drug companies.

Immigration

Spanberger objected to Trump's travel bans from certain predominantly Muslim countries and argued that they would aid jihadist propaganda by allowing a portrayal of the United States as an anti-Muslim country. She has voiced her support for stronger border security measures but opposes Trump's proposed wall. She voted for a bill that included funding for border infrastructure, technology at ports of entry and more customs and border patrol agents. She said she does not support "sanctuary cities" but also called the term "a campaign slogan a lot of people get caught up in." She added that it "degrades the value of the conversation if we're not actually talking about what the real concern is." Spanberger called for a pathway to legal status for undocumented immigrants who abide by the laws, work, and pay taxes.

Spanberger voted to allow U.S. Immigration and Customs Enforcement to be notified when undocumented immigrants attempt to purchase firearms, and voted against the House budget in summer 2019 because it failed to acknowledge the growing national debt.

Donald Trump
According to FiveThirtyEights congressional vote tracker, Spanberger voted with President Donald Trump 6.9% of the time—about one seventh of the expected tally (49.1%) when factoring in the district's partisan leaning and general partisanship in Congress. In the 2016 presidential election, Trump defeated Hillary Clinton with 50% of the vote to her 44% in Spanberger's congressional district.

On September 23, 2019, Spanberger joined six other freshman House Democrats with national security backgrounds in calling for an impeachment inquiry into Trump. They co-wrote a Washington Post opinion piece explaining their support for an impeachment inquiry, writing: "Congress must determine whether the president was indeed willing to use his power and withhold security assistance funds to persuade a foreign country to assist him in an upcoming election." They wrote that if the allegations were true, they amounted to "a flagrant disregard for the law" and "a threat to all we have sworn to protect." Spanberger later announced that she would vote in favor of impeachment. "The President's actions violate his oath of office, endanger our national security, and betray the public trust", she said.

On June 1, 2020, Spanberger tweeted criticism of Trump's reaction to the George Floyd protests, a series of protests against police brutality that began in Minneapolis on May 26. On June 2, The Washington Post and The New York Times quoted Spanberger and several other high-profile former CIA analysts' interpretations of Trump's reaction to the protests as reminiscent of the reaction of totalitarian dictators on the brink of losing control of their dictatorships. "As a former CIA officer, I know this playbook, and I know the president's actions are betraying the very foundation of the rule of law he purports to support, the U.S. Constitution", she said. Spanberger took issue with Trump after police used tear gas and rubber bullets on peaceful protestors and a priest during the George Floyd protests to clear a path so that he could have a photo op in front of St. John's Episcopal Church.

Spanberger opposed Democrats' attempts to amend the Insurrection Act of 1807, saying that amending the rarely used law would not accomplish what Democrats intended.

Joe Biden
As of June 2022, Spanberger had voted in line with Joe Biden's stated position 100% of the time.

In a November 2021 interview with the New York Times, Spanberger criticized Biden after the 2021 Virginia gubernatorial election, saying, "Nobody elected him to be F.D.R., they elected him to be normal and stop the chaos." She also said the Democrats had not sufficiently recognized that "inflation is a problem".

Electoral history

Personal life
Spanberger is married to Adam Spanberger, and they have three daughters. In 2014, the family moved back to Henrico County. They live in Glen Allen, Virginia. She is a Protestant.

See also

Women in the United States House of Representatives

References

External links

 Congresswoman Abigail Spanberger official U.S. House website
 Official campaign website

|-

1979 births
21st-century American politicians
American Protestants
Christians from Virginia
Democratic Party members of the United States House of Representatives from Virginia
Female members of the United States House of Representatives
Living people
People from Henrico County, Virginia
People from Red Bank, New Jersey
People of the Central Intelligence Agency
Krannert School of Management alumni
Protestants from Virginia
United States Postal Service people
University of Virginia alumni
Women in Virginia politics
American gun control activists
21st-century American women politicians